Anthony Talo (born 8 January 1996) is an association football and futsal player from the Solomon Islands. He plays as a goalkeeper for Kossa in the Telekom S-League and the Solomon Islands national futsal team.

Club career
Talo came through the youth ranks of the Solomon Warriors and made his debut for the club in 2015. Since 2016, he has been a regular for the club. In 2017, he moved to Marist.

International career
Talo made his debut for the Solomon Islands national futsal team at the 2012 FIFA Futsal World Cup in an 11-3 loss against Colombia. At that same tournament, he scored a goal to mark the Kurukuru's historic 4-3 win against Guatemala. He has also played at the 2016 and 2021 World Cups.

References

1996 births
Living people
Futsal goalkeepers
Solomon Islands footballers
Solomon Islands international footballers
Association football forwards
Solomon Islands men's futsal players
Western United F.C. players